Madrasa is a 2013 Afghan drama film written, produced and directed by Asad Sikandar. The film starring Asad Sikandar, Diana Sikandar and Thamina Rajabova. the film is based on true story about Afghan refugee family living in Iran after war in Afghanistan. the film released on 6 July 2013 in Kabul and on 14 October 2014 in Mumbai.

Plot
The film tells the true story about Afghan refugee family living in Iran after war in Afghanistan. The film portrays an innocent 8 year old Afghan girl Meena who wants to go to school, but circumstances and law in Iran don't allow her to do so. Her father Farhad goes every extent so that his daughter can go to school and fulfill her dream of becoming a doctor. The story reaches a point where everything seems impossible but courage, love and sacrifice makes its own statement.

Cast
 Asad Sikandar as Farhad
 Diana Sikandar as Meena
 Thamina Rajabova as Rahila
 Farooq Sarkosh as Haji Agha
 Mohammad Sherzai as Ali

Music
KK scored the music for film.

See also
Cinema of Afghanistan

References

External links
 

2013 films
Dari-language films
Films shot in Afghanistan
Drama films based on actual events
Afghan drama films
2013 drama films